David O'Byrne (born 17 March 1969) is an Australian trade unionist and politician. A prominent union leader prior to entering politics and the brother of fellow politician Michelle O'Byrne, he has been a Labor Party member of the Tasmanian House of Assembly since 2018 and previously served from 2010 to 2014, representing the electorate of Franklin.

He served as a minister under Premiers David Bartlett and Lara Giddings, variously holding the portfolios of environment, parks and heritage; workplace relations; arts; sport and recreation; hospitality; economic development and infrastructure, and innovation, science and technology. He was widely tipped as a potential future Labor leader before losing his seat to Liberal Paul Harriss at the 2014 election.

He served in cabinet with his sister Michelle O'Byrne, one of a very few pairs of siblings serving in cabinet together anywhere in the world.

In 2018 O'Byrne was re-elected to the House of Assembly with a strong personal vote topping the Labor ticket. In May 2021, he was re-elected.  In June 2021, O'Byrne replaced Rebecca White as the leader of the Tasmanian Labor Party.  David O'Byrne won the position of Labor’s 20th leader in the state after, winning 74 per cent of the vote to right aligned Braddon MP Shane Broad's 26 per cent.  O'Byrne resigned the leadership in July 2021, and Rebecca White was re-elected as leader.

Early life
O'Byrne was born in Launceston, where his father was a painter, and his mother worked as a cleaner. Both his parents were also shop stewards for their unions. O'Byrne studied at the University of Adelaide where he gained a degree in Labour Studies. He moved to Hobart in 1994.

Union official and leader

O'Byrne was initially employed by the Health and Community Services Union, and then with the Liquor, Hospitality and Miscellaneous Union (LHMU).

Elected as Tasmanian secretary of the LHMU in 2001 and was re-elected unopposed in 2002 and 2006. He also served as national vice president of the union between 2008 and 2010.

O'Byrne's leadership steered successful outcomes in campaigns to get better wages and conditions for child care workers, casino workers and cleaners. He has fought for job security for public school cleaners and grounds people, as well as for greater recognition for early years professionals. He also played a lead role in the Your Rights at Work Campaign.

While with the LHMU, O'Byrne led the Union's campaign to make Tasmania the first state to protect hospitality workers and the public by introducing a ban on smoking in enclosed areas of bars and casinos.

O'Byrne also served as state president of the ALP Tasmanian Branch from 2004 to 2006 and senior vice president of Unions Tasmania between 2001 and 2009.

O'Byrne has made significant contributions to the community through his roles as chair of Smoke Free Tasmania, member of the Ministerial Advisory Council on Child Care, member of the State Facilitating Group Anti-Poverty Week Organising Committee, co chair of the Anti-Poverty Week Organising Committee, founding member and chair of the Peace Coalition (a group established to protest the invasion of Iraq), and treasurer of the Tasmanian Peace Trust.

He has held leadership positions of national vice president of the LHMU since 2007, senior vice president of Unions Tasmania 2001–2008, ALP state president 2004–2006 and ALP vice president 2001–2004.

Member for Franklin

O'Byrne was preselected as an endorsed Labor candidate for the Tasmanian House of Assembly electorate of Franklin on 21 July 2009. He was subsequently elected at the 20 March 2010 state election, polling second on the Labor ticket to defeat incumbent Labor MHAs Ross Butler and Daniel Hulme.

O'Byrne's ministerial responsibilities originally encompassed Environment, Parks and Heritage; Workplace Relations; Arts; Sport and Recreation and the newly created Hospitality portfolio. Following a ministerial reshuffle in December 2010, he was promoted to the portfolios of Economic Development and of Infrastructure, whilst retaining the portfolio of Workplace Relations. In February 2011 he was granted the additional portfolio of Innovation, Science and Technology upon the resignation of Premier David Bartlett, who had held that portfolio. He also assumed the portfolio of Police and Emergency Management shortly thereafter.

O'Byrne held the portfolios of Economic Development, Infrastructure, Workplace Relations, Innovation, Science and Technology, and Police and Emergency Management.

O'Byrne lost his seat at the March 2014 election. He was returned to parliament in 2018.

Following the 2021 state election, O'Byrne nominated to lead the Labor Party. Dual nominations for the leadership position sparked a contested ballot of members. On 15 June 2021, O'Byrne was declared to be the successful candidate, with 74% of the vote.

Sexual harassment allegations and subsequent removal from the Parliamentary Labor Party
In July 2021, O’Byrne resigned the leadership following an allegation of sexual harassment relating to alleged events in 2007 and 2008 which was levelled at him by a former union staffer, also the now wife of the Tasmanian Labor party’s Right faction convener.  O’Byrne willingly participated in an investigation conducted by Barbara Deegan, a former commissioner of the Commonwealth industrial tribunals from 1996–2014, now conducting workplace investigations for one of the largest consulting firms in Australia. The report found he did not engage in any sexual harassment or victimisation.

Despite being cleared of the complaint, much media attention ensued.  Former Premier Paul Lennon and the Tasmanian Labor Party Leader, Rebecca White, called publicly for his resignation from Parliament. His position in the Parliamentary Labor Caucus was made untenable given calls from the leader for his resignation. He remains the Labor member for Franklin but is not currently included in the Parliamentary Labor Caucus, despite having the support of many Caucus members to remain. 

Recent media reporting has outlined the emergence of factional in-fighting in Tasmania Labor.  Simon Bevilaqua, reporting in the Mercury in September 2021,  said, “astute observers realise a civil war is being waged in Labor and Lennon is pitted squarely against O’Byrne.”

United Voice national secretary

In May 2014 it was announced that O'Byrne would take on the role of national secretary of his former union United Voice. O'Byrne was acting national secretary until September, when it was expected he would be formally elected into the role. He was elected to national secretary at the union's national council meeting held in September.

After commuting from his home in Hobart to Sydney for the role for over a year, with a young family based in Hobart, he made the decision to resign from the position of national secretary to return to live permanently in Tasmania.

Not for profit role
In July 2015 O'Byrne was appointed chief operating officer for the not for profit Beacon Foundation. The foundation, whilst founded and based in Hobart, works with disadvantaged communities in every state across Australia, working to assist schools and industry work together to help young Australians on a positive pathway post secondary education.

Personal life
O'Byrne lives in Hobart with his wife and two daughters.

References

Saviour rescues centre (The Mercury report, April 2009)
Union chief announces political intentions (ABC News report, March 2009)

External links
David O'Byrne - Labor For Franklin
 

1969 births
Living people
Leaders of the Opposition in Tasmania
Members of the Tasmanian House of Assembly
Australian Labor Party members of the Parliament of Tasmania
Australian trade unionists
University of Adelaide alumni
Politicians from Launceston, Tasmania
21st-century Australian politicians